Great Nunatak is a  elevation summit located  west of Valdez in the Chugach Mountains of the U.S. state of Alaska. This 2.2-mile long feature has a secondary summit, elevation 3,412 ft. Great Nunatak traces its name to Grove Karl Gilbert, a geologist with the United States Geological Survey who was part of the 1899 Harriman Alaska expedition that explored this area. He believed it to be the largest nunatak in Alaska when he casually referred to it as "the great nunatak" in a 1902 publication. The mountain's name was officially adopted in 1975 by the U.S. Board on Geographic Names. While the name remains, its status as a nunatak is obsolete because glacier lobes that once barely touched, now no longer completely encircle this landform as the Columbia Glacier retreats, and tidewater of Columbia Bay replaces the ice on the north and west aspects of the mountain.

Climate

Based on the Köppen climate classification, Great Nunatak is located in a subarctic climate zone with long, cold, snowy winters, and mild summers. Weather systems coming off the Gulf of Alaska are forced upwards by the Chugach Mountains (orographic lift), causing heavy precipitation in the form of rainfall and snowfall. Temperatures can drop below −20 °C with wind chill factors below −30 °C. This climate supports the Columbia Glacier near this mountain. The months May through June offer the most favorable weather for climbing or viewing.

See also

List of mountain peaks of Alaska
Geography of Alaska

References

Gallery

External links
 National Weather Service Forecast

Mountains of Alaska
Landforms of Chugach Census Area, Alaska
North American 1000 m summits